The Cryptoniscidae are a family of isopod crustaceans in the suborder Cymothoida. The original description was made by Kossmann in 1880. "Liriopsidae" is a junior synonym. Members of this family are hyperparasites of rhizocephalid barnacles which are themselves parasites of decapod crustaceans. The morphology of the adult females gives little clue as to their true identity, but the free-living larvae show their true taxonomic affiliations.

The family contains these genera:
Cryptoniscus F. Müller, 1864
Danalia Giard, 1887
Enthylacus Pérez, 1920
Eumetor Kossmann, 1872
Faba Nierstrasz & Brender à Brandis, 1930
Liriopsis Schultze in Müller, 1859
Perezina Nierstrasz & Brender à Brandis, 1930
Zeuxokoma Grygier, 1993

References

Cymothoida
Crustacean families